Paul Golding (born January 1982) is a British far-right political leader who is currently the leader of Britain First.

In December 2016, Golding was sentenced to eight weeks imprisonment for breaching a court order banning him from entering a mosque or encouraging others to do so in England and Wales. He took six months leave from the party and Jayda Fransen, the deputy leader, acted as leader during his absence. On 7 March 2018, Golding and Fransen were both imprisoned for religiously aggravated harassment.

Political career

British National Party
Golding was a British National Party (BNP) Sevenoaks District councillor for St Mary's Ward in Swanley from 2009 to 2011. He was also a communications officer for the party.

He stood as BNP candidate for Sevenoaks in the 2010 general election, and received 2.8% of the vote.

In 2008, it was reported that Golding had been expelled from the BNP for physically attacking Lawrence Rustem, a BNP Barking Borough Council councillor who is half-Turkish.

Britain First
He stood in the 2014 local elections and as a Britain First lead candidate in the 2014 European Parliamentary election for Wales; the party received 0.9% of the vote. Golding had been a member of the neo-Nazi National Front and once attended a Cenotaph on Remembrance Sunday wearing women's underwear on his head. As leader of Britain First Golding made it into the leading anti-Muslim, counter-jihad street movement.

In May 2015, Golding threatened to bury a pig at the site of proposed mosque in Dudley, mistakenly believing this would contaminate the site and render it unsuitable. At the Britain First Annual Conference in November 2015, Golding and his then deputy, Jayda Fransen, led the meeting which agreed a number of policies including banning the media from using the word 'racism' and abolishing the BBC.

He stood as a candidate in the London mayoral election in 2016. He came eighth with 31,372 votes (1.2% of those cast) while Labour's Sadiq Khan was elected as mayor.

Conservative Party 
In December 2019, Golding announced that he was a paid-up member of the Bexleyheath and Crayford Conservative Association. He explained that he intended to "help solidify Boris Johnson's control on the leadership, so we can achieve Brexit and hopefully cut immigration and confront radical Islam". Shortly after the announcement, a Tory spokeswoman said that "Paul Golding's application for membership of the Conservative Party has not been approved." In January 2020, Golding released a letter that he had received from the Conservative Party, informing him that his membership had been rejected. In June 2020, Golding spoke at a far-right protest in central London.

Legal issues

In May 2014, Golding was arrested for criminal damage and breach of the peace during an Al-Muhajiroun protest outside the Indian High Commission in London. In July 2014, he tried to have himself arrested at Bexleyheath police station over an incident at Crayford Mosque, but failed, an act widely considered to be a fund-raising publicity stunt.

In August 2014, the Advertising Standards Authority accused Britain First of illegally using an image of the royal crown in its logo, ordering all images of the crown to be removed from Britain First's official website, marketing materials and merchandise "with immediate effect". Golding responded by calling the ASA a "toothless quango with no power which no one takes any notice of" and refused to change Britain First's logo.

In March 2015, he was arrested on suspicion of assault during a Britain First march in Derby, as was an opponent who Golding had claimed assaulted him. Also in 2015, Golding was convicted of harassing a woman, after mistakenly arriving at her home instead of that of a man allegedly linked to the 2005 London bombings. He was also found guilty of wearing a political uniform, an offence under the Public Order Act 1936. A restraining order was issued against Golding and he was fined for both offences.

In September 2017, Golding and acting leader Jayda Fransen were arrested and charged with religious harassment. They were both bailed to appear before Medway magistrates in October 2017. Their arrests followed an investigation by Kent Police into the distribution of leaflets in the Thanet and Canterbury areas, and the posting of online videos during a trial at Canterbury Crown Court in May 2017.

Golding's Twitter account is withheld in Germany.

December 2016 arrest and resignation

In December 2016, Golding was sentenced to eight weeks in prison for breaching a court order banning him from entering a mosque or encouraging others to do so in England and Wales. Nine days after the imposition of the court injunction, Golding drove others to a mosque in Cardiff; they entered and mosque members found their behaviour provocative and unnerving. They feared the situation could have escalated if prayers had still been going on.

Leadership of Britain First was passed on to the former deputy leader Jayda Fransen in November 2016. Fransen claimed that Golding was taking 6 months leave as leader of the organisation "to address some important, personal family issues".

The satirical news web site, The Rochdale Herald, capitalised on the incident by inviting readers to sponsor his incarceration to raise money for refugees.

On 7 November 2017, Golding was sentenced to a 120-day suspended prison sentence and ordered to carry out 200 hours of unpaid community work by Sevenoaks Magistrates' Court after admitting a charge of assault by beating. He was also told to pay £750 compensation to his victim, plus £115 victim surcharge and £85 prosecution costs. Summing up, magistrate Alan Austen described it as "a really nasty and vicious assault in a public place".

2017 arrest

In December 2017, on a reported visit to Belfast to support Jayda Fransen, Golding was arrested by the Police Service of Northern Ireland for a speech he gave in the city in August, and was later charged.

2018 conviction

On 7 March 2018, Fransen and Golding were found guilty of religiously aggravated harassment at Folkestone Magistrates' Court, as a result of an investigation concerning the distribution of leaflets in 2017 in the Thanet and Canterbury areas. The pair were convicted over an incident at a takeaway in Ramsgate, Kent, during which Fransen screamed “paedophile” and “foreigner”, while Fransen was also convicted for approaching a mistaken address she believed to belong to a Muslim defendant on a rape trial. They were both sentenced to prison, with 9 months for Fransen and 18 weeks for Golding.

2018 arrest

In November 2018, Golding was charged with a number of offences related to anti-immigration leaflets distributed in Ballymena, County Antrim, and was charged with three counts of publishing written material intended to stir up hatred and one count of using threatening, abusive, insulting words or behaviour. In June 2019, he was sentenced to three months imprisonment, suspended for two years.

2020 terrorism conviction

In February 2020, Golding was charged under the Terrorism Act for refusing to provide police at Heathrow Airport with the PIN codes for his phone and computer. Golding was stopped at Heathrow airport in October 2019, while returning from a trip to the Russian parliament, by officers from the Metropolitan Police's counter-terrorism command. He was subsequently sentenced to a conditional discharge for nine months and ordered to pay a £21 victim surcharge and £750 in costs.

Alleged sex attack
In late 2017, accusations were made against Golding by a young woman, who attended one of the group rallies protesting against the sexual abuse of young girls, that Golding had sexually abused her. Graham Morris, a former Britain First member, had claimed that the deputy leader, Jayda Fransen, had encouraged the victim to stay quiet, saying, "I can give everything you need, a platform. I'll do this for you, that for you." On 11 July 2018, the Greater Manchester Police dropped the case.

Donald Trump retweets

On 29 November 2017, US president Donald Trump retweeted three anti-Muslim videos shared by Jayda Fransen on her Twitter account supporting her views. Three weeks later, on 18 December, Twitter suspended the accounts of Golding, Fransen and Britain First for inciting racial hatred. They later joined and asked their followers to go to the Gab social networking service created as an alternative to social networks like Facebook, Twitter and Reddit.

Elections contested
UK general elections

European Parliament elections

London mayoral election

References

1982 births
Living people
British National Party people
British Eurosceptics
British politicians convicted of crimes
British critics of Islam
Counter-jihad activists
Criminals from Kent
British neo-fascist politicians
Islamophobia in the United Kingdom
Anti-Islam sentiment in the United Kingdom
People convicted of harassment
Prisoners and detainees of England and Wales
Leaders of political parties in the United Kingdom